Indian English poetry is the oldest form of Indian English literature. Indian poets writing in English have succeeded to nativize or indianize English in order to reveal typical Indian situations. Henry Louis Vivian Derozio is considered the first poet in the lineage of Indian English poetry followed by Rabindranath Tagore, Sri Aurobindo, Sarojini Naidu, Michael Madhusudan Dutt, and Toru Dutt, among others.

History

Nissim Ezekiel is considered to be a pioneering figure in modern Indian English Poetry.His first book, A Time to Change, was published in 1952. The significant poets of the post-Derozio and pre-Ezekiel times are Toru Dutt, Michael Madhusudan Dutt, Sarojini Naidu, Sri Aurobindo and Rabindranath Tagore. Some of the notable poets of Ezekiel's time are A. K. Ramanujan, R. Parthasarathy, Gieve Patel, Jayant Mahapatra, Dom Moraes, Kamala Das, Keki N. Daruwalla, Arvind Krishna Mehrotra, Shiv K. Kumar, Arun Kolatkar and Dilip Chitre. Rabindranath Tagore wrote primarily in Bengali and created a small body of work (mainly prose) in English and was responsible for the translations of his own work into English.

Poets
Other notable 20th century poets of English poetry in India include Eunice De Souza, Gieve Patel, Kersy Katrak and P. Lal among others. The younger generation of poets writing in English are Abhay K, Adil Jussawalla, A. J. Thomas, Anju Makhija, Anjum Hasan, Arundhathi Subramaniam, Binay Laha, Dr. Abdul Wahab Sukhan, Hoshang Merchant, Madan Gopal Gandhi, Bibhu Padhi, C. P. Surendran, Dileep Jhaveri, Anuradha Bhattacharyya, Gopi Kottoor, Jayanta Mahapatra, Jeet Thayil, Sridala Swami, Jerry Pinto, Urvashi Bahuguna, K Srilata, K. V. Dominic, D. C. Chambial, T. Vasudeva Reddy, Makarand Paranjape, Akhil Katyal, Mani Rao, Meena Kandasamy, Menka Shivdasani, Manohar Shetty, Priya Sarukkai Chabria, Sharanya Manivannan, Ranjit Hoskote, Jaydeep Sarangi, Jayanthi Manoj Robin Ngangom, Nitoo Das, Rukmini Bhaya Nair, S. Anand, Salik Shah, Sudeep Sen, Sukrita Paul Kumar, Nalini Priyadarshni, Vijay Nambisan, Kumar Vikram, Durga Prasad Panda, Brian Mendonca, Syam Sudhakar, Vihang A. Naik, Tapan Kumar Pradhan, Amitabh Mitra and Yuyutsu Sharma among others.

Modern expatriate Indian poets writing in English include Meena Alexander, Ravi Shankar, Sujata Bhatt, Tabish Khair, Vikram Seth and Vijay Seshadri among others

Anthologies

Notable anthologies of Indian English poetry include Ten Twentieth-Century Indian Poets (edited by R. Parthasarathy), Three Indian Poets: Nissim Ezekiel, A K Ramanujan, Dom Moraes (edited by Bruce Alvin King), The Oxford India Anthology of Twelve Modern Indian Poets (edited by Arvind Krishna Mehrotra), 'Reasons for Belonging: Fourteen Contemporary Indian Poets (edited by Ranjit Hoskote), 60 Indian Poets (edited by Jeet Thayil), HarperCollins Anthology of English Poetry (edited by Sudeep Sen), Voices Now World Poetry Today (Edited by Binay Laha &B. K. Sorkar), Anthology of Contemporary Indian Poetry (edited by Menka Shivdasani, published by Michael Rothenberg in 2004); Ten: The New Indian Poets (edited and selected by Jayanta Mahapatra and Yuyutsu Sharma, New Delhi/Jaipur: Nirala Publications).

Awards and laurels
Muse India – Satish Verma Young Writers Award, Hyderabad, India
SAARC Literary Award – New Delhi, India
Sahitya Akademi Award – New Delhi, India
Indology Literary Award -Raiganj, India.

Journals
Indian Literature – published by Sahitya Akademi, New Delhi, India
The Indian P.E.N. – edited by Nissim Ezekiel, Mumbai, India
Indology -edited by Binay Laha, West Bengal 
The Journal of Poetry Society of India – published by The Poetry Society (India), New Delhi, India
Kavya Bharati – published by SCILET: The Study Centre for Indian Literature in English and Translation, edited by R. P. Nair Madurai, Tamil Nadu, India
Mithila Review – founding editor and publisher Salik Shah, New Delhi, India
Muse India – founder and managing editor G. Surya Prakash Rao, Hyderabad, India
Coldnoon: Travel Poetics – edited by Arup K. Chatterjee, New Delhi, India
Poetry Chain – edited by Gopi Kottoor, Kerala, India

See also
Indian poetry
Contemporary Indian Poetry in English
Indian English Poetry
List of Indian English poetry anthologies
List of English poets from India
The Poetry Society (India)

References

Further reading 
 Arora, Sudhir K. "Cultural And Philosophical Reflections In Indian Poetry In English" (5 volumes). Authorspress, New Delhi, 2016.
 Chinhade, Sirish. Five Indian English Poets. New Delhi. Atlantic Publishers and Distributors, 1996.
 Das, Sisir Kumar. A History of Indian Literature (3 volumes). New Delhi. Sahitya Akademi, 2000.
 Iyengar, KRS. Indian Writing in English. New Delhi. Sterling Publishers Private Limited, 2002.
 King, Bruce. Modern Indian Poetry in English. New Delhi. Oxford University Press, 2004.
 Mitra, Zinia. Indian Poetry in English : Critical Essays. PHI Learning , New Delhi, 2016. 
 Naik, M.K. A History of Indian English Literature. New Delhi, Sahitya Akademi, 2004.
 Sarangi, Jaydeep. "Explorations in Indian English Poetry". Authorspress, New Delhi, 2007.

External links 
Five reasons Indian poetry matters more than ever
Cultural Semiotics Reading of Contemporary Indian Poetry in English
Contemporary Indian English Poetry
 Roy, Pinaki. "Indian English Poetry: A very brief history". Contemporary Indian Poetry in English. Eds. Sarkar, J., and S. Mondal. New Delhi: Authors Press, 2016, pp. 11–29.
Mitra, Amitabh. "Unforgettable Times: Indo English Poetry in the Seventies" 

Poetry movements
Indian poetry
Indian literary movements